Matto or Mattō may refer to:

Places
 Mattō, Ishikawa, a former city in Ishikawa Prefecture, Japan, now part of Hakusan
 Mattō Station, a railway station in the city of Hakusan, Ishikawa, Japan
 Monte Matto, a mountain in Italy

People and fictional characters
 Juan Matto (born 1977), Paraguayan footballer
 Juan Bautista Rivarola Matto (1933–1999), Paraguayan journalist, narrator, essayist and playwright
 Sergio Matto (1930–?), Uruguayan basketball player
 Il Matto (Italian for "The Fool"), a character in the film La Strada, played by Richard Basehart

See also
 Matos (disambiguation), also includes Mattos